Black Sands is an unincorporated community and census-designated place (CDP) in Hawaii County, Hawaii, United States. It is bordered to the southeast, across Hawaii Route 130, by the community of Seaview.

Black Sands was first listed as a CDP prior to the 2020 census.

Demographics

References 

Census-designated places in Hawaii County, Hawaii
Census-designated places in Hawaii
Unincorporated communities in Hawaii County, Hawaii